Roman Hifo is a New Zealand rugby league footballer who represented the United States in the 2013 World Cup.

Playing career
Hifo played for the Waitakere Rangers in the 2007 Bartercard Cup. He was then signed by the New Zealand Warriors for their development squad.

In 2010 Hifo played for the Papakura Sea Eagles in the Auckland Rugby League competition, where he was named the lock of the year. In 2011 and 2012 he played for the Counties Manukau Stingrays in the National Competition.

In 2013 Hifo captained the Mangere East Hawks. He was named in the United States squad for the World Cup, qualifying through his American Samoan heritage.

In 2016, he was named to play for the New Zealand Residents side.

Coaching career
In his 2015 off-season Roman was in charge of Otahuhu College's senior rugby league team, a college that produced players the likes of Roger Tuivasa-Sheck, in their National Rugby League Secondary Schools championship campaign. They took on 13-time national champions St Paul's from Auckland. Roman's team were down 13–0 at half-time but pulled the margin back to 5 points inside the remaining few minutes of the match. It was a dramatic finish to the match with Roman's team scoring another try in the final 10 seconds of the game pulling the score back to 17–16, leaving it down to a conversion after the full-time siren. Roman's team converted the goal and therefore won the title for the first time since 2011.

References

1986 births
New Zealand rugby league coaches
New Zealand rugby league players
New Zealand people of American Samoan descent
United States national rugby league team players
Counties Manukau rugby league team players
Waitakere rugby league team players
Papakura Sea Eagles players
Mangere East Hawks players
Rugby league locks
Living people